American singer and actress Dove Cameron has released four soundtrack albums, two extended plays (EPs), twelve singles (including one single as a featured artist), twenty-four promotional singles and eighteen music videos. In 2018, she was signed to Disruptor Records, a label of Columbia Records. On September 27, 2019, Cameron released her debut extended play, Bloodshot / Waste. Cameron was previously a part of the musical duo The Girl and the Dreamcatcher with Liv and Maddie co-star Ryan McCartan.

Albums

Studio albums

Soundtrack albums

Singles

As lead artist

As featured artist

Promotional singles

Other charted songs

Other appearances

Music videos

References

Notes

Sources

Discographies of American artists
Pop music discographies